Phantom Canyon is a canyon located in Colorado, in the Western United States. It is in the Laramie Foothills region of Colorado, near Fort Collins. It is formed by the  North Fork of the Cache la Poudre River. It is one of the only canyons in the Colorado Front Range that is roadless.

External links 
 https://www.nature.org/en-us/get-involved/how-to-help/places-we-protect/phantom-canyon-preserve/

Canyons and gorges of Colorado
Landforms of Larimer County, Colorado